Metropolitan Philaret (secular name Georgy Nikolayevich Voznesensky, ; 22 March 1903 in Kursk, Russia – 21 November 1985 in New York City) was the First Hierarch of the Russian Orthodox Church Outside Russia from 1964 until his death on November 21, 1985.

He was ordained a deacon in 1930 and a priest in 1931. He served in Harbin (1931-1947), Tryokhrechye (1947-1949), then again in Harbin (1949-1962). In 1945-1962 he was a cleric of the Moscow Patriarchate. In 1962, he left China for Australia, joining the ROCOR. On May 26, 1963, he was ordained bishop of Brisbane, vicar of the Diocese of Australia and New Zealand. On May 27, 1964, being a youngest bishop by ordination, he was elected the First Hierarch of the ROCOR. The years when Metropolitan Philaret headed the ROCOR became a period of making important decisions, including the anathematization of Lenin and the persecutors of the Orthodoxy (1970), the Canonization of the Nicholas II family and the New Martyrs (1981), the condemnation of ecumenism (1983). Russian Russian Church Abroad has noticeably distanced itself from world Orthodoxy, got closer to the Old Calendarists, ordained Lazar (Zhurbenko) as a bishop for the Russian "catacombs".

Life 
Georgy Voznesensky was born on March 22, 1903 in Kursk, Russia into a family of a priest, Father Nicholas Voznesensky and his wife Lydia. In 1909, his family moved to Blagoveschensk on the Amur River in Siberia.

In 1920, Georgy graduated from the local gymnasium. Later in 1920 in the midst of the Russian Civil War, his family moved to Harbin, Manchuria.

In 1921, his mother died, and his father accepted tonsure as a monk with the name Dimitri. Dimitri later became Archbishop of Hailar. He died in 1947 shortly after he repatriated to the Soviet Union.

Living in Harbin, Voznesensky entered the Russo-Chinese Polytechnic Institute from which he graduated in 1927 as an electromechanical engineer. 

On 18 May 1930, he was ordained a deacon. On 4 January 1931, he was ordained a Hieromonk. On 12 December 1931 he was tonsured a monk with the name Philaret. In 1931, he graduated from St. Vladimir University. Soon afterwards, he entered the Pastoral and Theological courses at the Institute of St. Prince Vladimir. The courses was launch by his father, Nicholas Voznesensky.

In 1933, he was elevated to hegumen and 1937 to the rank of archimandrite. During this period he was also a professor of New Testament, Pastoral Theology, and Homiletics at St. Vladimir University.

In mid 1945, after the Communist Chinese and Soviet forces took over Manchuria at the end of World War II, archimandrite Philaret remained with the Orthodox believers in Manchuria, but he firmly rejected all attempts to get him to accept a Soviet passport. He held passport burning bonfires after church services in defiance of the communist authorities. Further, he fearlessly denounced the atheistic communists. His overt position against the Soviets placed him in great personal danger. Their hatred of him resulted in an attempt to burn him alive in his monastic cell. He escaped, but suffered severe burns.

Departure from China and serving in Australia 
By that time, the Russian population was leaving China en masse, settling on the West Coast of the United States or Australia. The Synod of Bishops of the ROCOR, aware of his irreconcilable position towards communism and the Soviet government, has been trying to rescue Archimandrite Philaret from China since 1953. It was only by 1962 that the Archimandrite Philaret could come to Hong Kong. Despite his anti-communist views and reputation as a confessor, Archimandrite Philaret had to repent that he had been under the jurisdiction of the Moscow Patriarchate since 1945, and also sign a "penitential statement" in the form established by Bishops' Council of the ROCOR. This statement was approved on March 29, 1962 at a meeting of the ROCOR Synod. He arrived to Sydney on 3 April 1962. From there archimandrite Philaret quickly traveled to Brisbane, Australia where many of his former flock in Manchuria had settled.

On October 22 of the same year, at the Council of Bishops of the ROCOR, where Archbishop Savva arrived, it was proposed to appoint Archimandrite Philaret to the Diocese of Brazil, but Archbishop Savva began to insist that Archimandrite Philaret be left in Australia and appointed vicar of the Australian diocese with the title of Bishop of Brisbane. Archbishop Savva reminded the bishops of his poor health and considered Archimandrite Philaret his possible successor, especially since many parishioners in Australia knew and respected Archimandrite Philaret, remembering his ministry in Harbin. The Council agreed to Savva's request and it was decided to ordain Archimandrite Philaret as vicar bishop for Australia.

On May 24, 1963, at the bishop's residence in Croydon, Archimandrite Philaret was nominated as a bishop. Nomination was performed by: Archbishop Savva (Rayevsky), his vicar Bishop Anthony (Medvedev) and hierarch of the Ecumenical Patriarchate of Constantinople bishop Dionysius (Psiahas) of Nazianzus. Archimandrite Philaret was consecrated as Bishop of Brisbane, vicar of the Australian diocese by archbishop Savva and bishop Anthony of Melbourne on May 26, 1963. Bishop Dionysius attended, but did not concelebrate. As Archbishop Savva's health deteriorated more and more, Bishops Anthony and Philaret assumed part of his duties.

First Hierarch 
In the early 1960s, a confrontation broke out in the ROCOR between supporters of Archbishop John (Maximovich) and supporters of Archbishop Nikon (Rklitsky), who were considered as the most likely candidates for the First Hierarch position. The conflict was fueled by 2 different visions of the ROCOR mission: the supporters of St. John saw the ROCOR open to everyone and were ready in some cases to sacrifice the rite and calendar, while the representatives of the opposite party were inclined to see the ROCOR as a structure whose main task was to preserve Russian traditions. The views on church administration also differed: St. John and his supporters saw sobornost as a living, functioning basis of church existence, while the supporters of Archbishop Nikon actually acted as defenders of the pre-revolutionary Synodal system, which in the conditions of emigration meant the dictate of the office of the Holy Synod. On February 7, 1964, Metropolitan Anastasius announced his desire to retire due to his old age and state of health. The real purpose of such a departure was the desire to control the election of his successor, with the help of his authority to prevent shocks, conflicts and possible division within ROCOR.

On May 27, 1964, at the Bishops' Council, 90-year-old Metropolitan Anastasius (Gribanovsky) retires. The votes cast for Archbishop John and for Archbishop Nikon were divided almost equally. None of the parties wanted to concede. To get out of a difficult situation, the First Hierarch advised the bishops to elect a "neutral" bishop who does not belong to any of the church parties and preferably a young one. The most suitable candidate was the youngest bishop by ordination — Bishop Philaret of Brisbane, whose candidacy was proposed by Archbishop John. In order to avoid a split, he stated that he would withdraw his candidacy if the majority voted for Bishop Philaret. Archbishops Nikon (Rklitsky) and Averky (Taushev) did the same. At the end of the voting, Metropolitan Anastasius was asked either to approve the election of Bishop Philaret, or to remain in office. The Metropolitan rejected the second proposal and agreed with the Council's decision to elect a new First Hierarch.

On May 31, 1964, in the Synodal Cathedral Church the Sign, his introduction took place. After the Liturgy with the participation of all hierarchs, a white hood was placed on Metropolitan Philaret, and Archbishop John (Maximovich) of San Francisco, as the oldest hierarch, handed him a baton, and a second panagia was placed on Metropolitan Anastasius.

Metropolitan Philaret served as the first hierarch of the ROCOR for twenty one years. He reposed on November 21, 1985 and was buried in the cemetery of the Church of Dormition.

In November 1998, the Synod decided to transfer Metropolitan Philaret's relics to a new vault under the altar of Holy Trinity Cathedral at Jordanville, New York. When his tomb was opened, his relics were found to be incorrupt.

Canonizations 
Metropolitan Philaret was canonized by the number of church groups which derive their succession from the ROCOR.

On May 19 – 20, 2001 Metropolitan Philaret was glorified by the Holy Orthodox Church in North America ("Boston Synod").

On April 30, 2003 Metropolitan Philaret was glorified by the Russian Orthodox Autonomous Church.

On November 20, 2008 Metropolitan Philaret was glorified by the (independent) Russian Orthodox Church Abroad headed by metropolitan Agathangel (Pashkovsky).

On October 23, 2009 Metropolitan Philaret was glorified at Holy Transfiguration Skete by the Russian Orthodox Church Abroad headed by archbishop Vladimir (Tselischev).

In 2012, the Eastern American Diocese of the Russian Orthodox Church Abroad headed by metropolitan Hilarion (Kapral) established a committee to explore the formal glorification of Metropolitan Philaret.

References

Sources

External links
 Metropolitan St. Philaret of New York (+1985)
 The Early Years of Our First Hierarch Metropolitan Philaret by Archbishop Nafanail (Lvov)
The Main Goal of Man is to Save his Soul for Eternity by Metropolitan Philaret (Voznesensky)
 The Free Part of the Russian Church, interview of Metr Philaret given to the West German Catholic weekly Publik
 The Vestments and Staff of His Eminence Metropolitan Philaret Are Given to His Holiness Patriarch Alexy

1903 births
1985 deaths
People from Kursk
20th-century Eastern Orthodox archbishops
First Hierarchs of the Russian Orthodox Church Outside Russia
White Russian emigrants to China
Eastern Orthodoxy in Australia